Pacific Coast Jet bus charters in California

History
Pacific Coast Jet LLC was formed in early 2006 in northern California with the goal of making private jet transportation affordable to executives, business owners and individuals who could not previously justify the expense of this convenience. Pacific Coast Jet's founders, an experienced professional pilot and a highly successful entrepreneur, have been lifelong aviation enthusiasts who have closely followed the evolution and development of the new "Very Light Jet" class of aircraft.

Fleet
The Pacific Coast Jet fleet consists of one bus (as of December 2020)

External links
 

2006 establishments in California
Airlines based in California
Airlines established in 2006
American companies established in 2006
Companies based in Oakland, California
Charter airlines of the United States